Ahonen is a Finnish surname meaning "small glade". Notable people with the surname include:

 Ari Ahonen (born 1981), Finnish professional hockey goalie
 Derek Ahonen (born 1980), Finnish/American Playwright
 Elise Ahonen (born 1960s), Finnish figure skater
 Esko Ahonen (born 1955), Finnish politician, member of the parliament
 Janne Ahonen (born 1977), Finnish professional and Olympic ski jumper
 Kirsi Ahonen (born 1976), Finnish javelin thrower 
 Olavi Ahonen (1923-2000), Finnish film actor 
 Rony Ahonen (born 1987), Finnish ice hockey player
 Roope Ahonen (born 1990), Finnish basketball player
 Veli-Matti Ahonen, Finnish ski jumper

Fictional characters
 Mika Ahonen, a character from the anime/manga Strike Witches

Finnish-language surnames